Public transport in Montcada i Reixac (Catalonia, Spain) is a part of the transportation network in the Metropolitan Area of Barcelona. The town is located in a geographically strategic position, immediately to the north of Barcelona's Nou Barris district and surrounded by the hills of Collserola and the adjacent towns of Vallès, and contains a few train stations which articulate the rail transport in the urban region.

Barcelona Metro stations
Barcelona Metro line L11 links Montcada i Reixac with Nou Barris. In the future it will be extended further into Montcada Centre and other towns in the area.

Railway stations

Future tram developments
A tram spanning the Vallès area, linking it to northern Barcelona and the so-called Metro del Vallès, has been proposed under the name Tramvallès, following the convention initiated with Trambaix (for Baix Llobregat), and Trambesòs (after the Besòs river). As of 2010 it remains under consideration by the Autoritat del Transport Metropolità.

References

Transport in other municipalities of the Metropolitan Area of Barcelona
 Transport in Badalona
 Transport in Barcelona
 Transport in Cornellà de Llobregat
 Transport in L'Hospitalet de Llobregat
 Transport in Sabadell
 Transport in Sant Cugat del Vallès
 Transport in Terrassa
 Transport in Sant Adrià de Besòs
 Transport in Santa Coloma de Gramenet

See also
List of Barcelona Metro stations
Autoritat del Transport Metropolità